Marling may refer to:

Places
 Marling, South Tyrol, Italy
 Marling, Missouri, United States

Other uses
 Marling (surname)
 Marling baronets
 Marling (horse), a Thoroughbred racehorse
 Marling School, a grammar school in Stroud, Gloucestershire, England
 Marlinspike, a tool used in marine ropework
 Spreading marl on land

See also
 Marlin (disambiguation)